Lone Cowboy: Live & Solo is the twenty-ninth album by American singer-songwriter Michael Martin Murphey, his first solo album, and his third live album. The album was recorded live in October 2008 at the Western Jubilee Warehouse Theater in Colorado Springs, Colorado, and was released January 12, 2010.

Track listing
 "Lone Cowboy" / "Carolina in the Pines" (Murphey) – 6:04
 "Partner to the Wind" / "Cool Water" (Murphey, Nolan) – 5:42
 "Little Joe the Wrangler" / "Oh Bury Me Not on the Lone Prairie" – 6:17
 "Long and Lonesome Road to Dalhart" (Murphey) – 4:49
 "Wildfire" (Cansler, Murphey) – 3:36
 "When the Work's All Done This Fall" – 4:01
 "What Am I Doing Here?" (Cook, Murphey, Rains) – 2:56
 "Vanishing Breed" (Hoffner, Murphey) – 3:50
 "Cherokee Fiddle" (Murphey) – 4:31
 "Close to the Land" (Murphey, Quist) – 5:39
 "Summer Ranges" (Murphey) – 3:32

Credits
Music
 Michael Martin Murphey – vocals, guitar, composer, liner notes

Production
 Hal Cannon – quotation author
 Kathleen Fox Collins – concert producer, design
 David Glasser – mastering
 Butch Hause – engineer, mixing, producer
 Donald Kallaus – design, photography
 Annie McFadin – concert producer
 Tyler O'Malley – concert producer
 Brendan O'Malley – concert producer
 Scott O'Malley – producer
 Jerry Riness – cover art, cover painting
 Victoria Ward – concert producer, design
 Woody Woodworth – concert producer

References

External links
 Michael Martin Murphey's Official Website
 Western Jubilee Recording Company

2010 live albums
Michael Martin Murphey albums
Western music (North America) albums